Culcreuch Castle is a Scottish castle close to the village of Fintry, near Loch Lomond. It had been the home of the Barons of Culcreuch since 1699. In the 1980s the castle was converted into a hotel, which it was run as until early 2020 when it was closed to the public by the American owners thus ending over 700 years of history. It had been until January 2020 one of the most continually inhabited Castles in Central Scotland.

History
Culcreuch Castle was built in 1296 by Maurice Galbraith. It was the clan seat of Clan Galbraith from 1320 to 1624, when it was sold to a cousin, Alexander Seton of Gargunnock, to settle a financial debt. In 1632, it was purchased by Robert Napier, a younger son of John Napier, the 8th Laird of Merchiston.  The Napier family held the estate for five generations. The castle was used to garrison Oliver Cromwell’s troops in 1654. In 1796, the castle was sold to Alexander Spiers of Glasgow, who built a cotton mill and a distillery in Fintry.  It was sold in 1890 to J. C. Dunwaters, then again in 1901 to Walter Menzies.  It passed into the hands of Hercules Robinson in the 1970s, the last of that line of the Menzies family.  It was sold in 1984 to Arthur Haslam, who operated the castle as a hotel.  In 2007, ownership was transferred to a holding company in Los Angeles, who took the decision to close the castle and business in 2020 ending over 700 years of continuous habitation.

Design
Culcreuch is a rectangular tower house, with three stories and an attic, topped by a parapet and slate roof.  The north and east extensions to the original tower were built after 1721 by the Napiers, and match the original tower.

References

External links

 Official site
 Gazetteer for Scotland

Castles in Stirling (council area)
Category A listed buildings in Stirling (council area)
Listed castles in Scotland
Clan Napier